Fossati's Delicatessen is the oldest deli in Texas and one of the oldest restaurants in the United States. Located in Victoria, Texas, Fossati's was opened in 1882 by Italian immigrant Fraschio ("Frank") Napoleon Fossati. Fossati's was added to the National Register of Historic Places on May 20, 1991. After over 130 years, Fossati's is still owned and operated by the same family. 

Fossati had the current building constructed in 1895 and moved the deli from a nearby downtown location (actually, Fossati's had changed locations several times, and had, at one time or another, been on every corner of the square in downtown Victoria). The current building features double front doors with multi-light transoms. 

Over the years, Fossati's has handled imported foods, groceries, and feed and has served as an important gathering place for Victoria's citizens. In addition, many famous musicians have played at the deli, including country music legend Willie Nelson. The deli is often used for political functions as well. Most recently, Texas Governor Rick Perry held a campaign stop in Victoria on August 25, 2010.

In the back room of the deli, known as the Frank Napoleon room, there is a giant bookcase filled with hundreds of cookbooks, many of which have been out of print for 50+ years. Also inside, there is a trench-like area just above the floor surrounding the bar. This is where men used to spit tobacco. Outside of the building there are still metal rings where men used to tie up their horses and come in for a drink.

See also

List of delicatessens
National Register of Historic Places listings in Victoria County, Texas
Recorded Texas Historic Landmarks in Victoria County

References

.

Italian-American culture in Texas
Restaurants in Texas
Commercial buildings on the National Register of Historic Places in Texas
Buildings and structures in Victoria, Texas
Restaurants established in 1882
Delicatessens in the United States
National Register of Historic Places in Victoria, Texas
Recorded Texas Historic Landmarks
Restaurants on the National Register of Historic Places